Hans Nilsen Hauge  (3 November 1853 – 17 December 1931) was a Norwegian priest and politician for Norway's Conservative Party. He was Minister of Education and Church Affairs from 1903 to 1905.

Knudsen was born in Nord-Audnedal,
and was the grandson of the revivalist lay preacher Hans Nielsen Hauge and son of priest Andreas Hauge. He enrolled as a student in 1871 and graduated as cand.theol. in 1877. He was acting vicar in Brevik from January to July 1879, and then worked in Skien until 1887, except for the years 1881 to 1886 when he was a sailors' padre in North Shields. In 1887 he became vicar in Brevik on a permanent basis. He was elected to the Norwegian Parliament from the city in 1895 and 1898. In 1900 he became vicar in Eidanger.

On 22 October 1903, when the second cabinet Hagerup assumed office, Hauge was appointed Norwegian Minister of Education and Church Affairs. The cabinet resigned on 10 March 1905 as a part of the build-up for the dissolution of the union between Norway and Sweden; Hauge did not retain the job. He did not return to Eidanger either, instead he became vicar in Skien. He changed job to dean in 1918, and retired in 1924.

Hauge was appointed a Knight of the Royal Norwegian Order of St. Olav and a Commander of the Order of the Dannebrog.

References

1853 births
1931 deaths
Government ministers of Norway
Members of the Storting
Conservative Party (Norway) politicians
Politicians from Telemark
Norwegian priest-politicians
Commanders of the Order of the Dannebrog
Ministers of Education of Norway